The Honda Passport is a line of sport utility vehicles (SUV) from the Japanese automaker Honda. Originally, it was a badge engineered version of the Isuzu Rodeo, a mid-size SUV sold between 1993 and 2002. It was introduced in 1993 for the 1994 model year as Honda's first entry into the growing SUV market of the 1990s in the United States. The first and second generation Passport was manufactured by Subaru Isuzu Automotive in Lafayette, Indiana. Like various other Honda models, it re-used a name from their motorcycle division, the Honda C75 Passport. The other two name candidates were Elsinore and Odyssey, the latter would be re-used a year later on a minivan.

The Passport was a part of a partnership between Isuzu and Honda in the 1990s, which saw an exchange of passenger vehicles from Honda to Isuzu, such as the Isuzu Oasis, and trucks from Isuzu to Honda, such as the Passport and Acura SLX. This arrangement was convenient for both companies, as Isuzu discontinued passenger car production in 1993 after a corporate restructuring, and Honda was in desperate need of an SUV, a segment that was growing in popularity in North America as well as Japan during the 1990s. The partnership ended in 2002 with the discontinuation of the Passport in favor of the Honda-engineered Pilot.

In November 2018, Honda announced that the Passport nameplate would return as a two-row mid-size crossover SUV slotted between the CR-V and Pilot. The third-generation Passport was unveiled at the Los Angeles Auto Show on November 27, 2018. It is built at Honda's factory in Lincoln, Alabama, and available for the 2019 model year.



First generation (C58; 1993) 

The first generation Passport was offered in three trims, the base model DX, mid-range LX, and upscale EX. DX models had a 5-speed manual transmission, rear-wheel-drive (RWD) layout and a 2.6 L four-cylinder engine producing . LX models could be had with an optional 4-speed automatic transmission, optional four-wheel-drive (4WD) and a 3.2 L V6 engine producing  as standard. The upscale EX offered the 3.2 L V6 engine and four-wheel-drive as standard. Some first generation Passports were equipped with a rear axle built by General Motors. Others had a Dana built "Spicer 44" rear axle.

Model year changes 
 For 1995 MY, the Passport received driver and front passenger airbags. EX trims gained extra equipment and features.
A shift-on-the-fly four-wheel-drive system became available.
 For 1997 MY, the DX trim was dropped. The 2.6 L engine option was also dropped. All models now had the V6 engine.

Second generation (CK58/CM58/DM58; 1997) 

For the second generation model, two trim levels were offered: LX and upscale EX. EX had the spare tire below the cargo area and LX mounted in a swing carrier at rear. Minor changes for the 2000 model year included the introduction of an even more upscale EX-L trim which added leather seats, 2-tone exterior colors, and a CD changer. The LX trim received an optional set of  wheels. 

In 2010, a recall was issued for affected 1998-2002 Rodeo and Passport for frames with severe rust issues. On September 22, 2010, NHTSA campaign number 10V436000 was issued to recall 149,992 vehicles because of excessive corrosion near the forward bracket for the left or right rear suspension lower link. If the rust damage was severe, Honda bought back the vehicles from their owners. Under U.S. federal regulations, automakers are not required to correct problems on vehicles that are ten or more years old.

Third generation (YF7/8; 2019) 

The third generation Passport was unveiled at the Los Angeles Auto Show on November 27, 2018, with retail sales starting in February 2019. Unlike previous generations, it was designed in the United States and is manufactured in Lincoln, Alabama alongside the Honda Pilot. It is based on the third-generation Honda Pilot, although the Passport is shorter and loses the third row seating. The Passport slots between the smaller CR-V and longer Pilot, filling the gap left when the Honda Crosstour was discontinued after the 2015 model year. The Passport competes against 2-row five-seater midsize crossovers like the Chevrolet Blazer, Ford Edge, Nissan Murano, and Subaru Outback.

Trim levels include the base "Sport", mid-level "EX-L", "Touring", and top-of-the-line "Elite”. Unlike other most of Honda nameplates like the CR-V and Pilot, the Passport does not have an LX trim, consequently the starting price of a Passport (Sport trim) costs more than that of the Pilot (LX trim). All trim levels include Front Wheel Drive (FWD) as standard equipment, with All-Wheel-Drive (AWD) as an option, except for the "Elite", where it is standard equipment.

Front-wheel drive is standard; Honda's all-wheel-drive system, dubbed i-VTM4 (Intelligent Variable Torque Management), is optional, and features drive settings for Normal, Sand, Snow, and Mud. A two-speed transfer case is not available.

Two rows of seats provide room for five passengers.

For the 2021 model year, all trims received the 8-inch touchscreen and Apple CarPlay and Android Auto as standard equipment.

Marketing 
On April 1, 2019, Honda released a YouTube advertisement for the all-new 2019 Passport. The advertisement featured a 2019 Passport, called the "Past-Port", with a first-generation Passport's interior, touting features that were popular in the mid-to-late-1990s, including automatic power windows, an audio system with cassette player and cassette adapter and pager holder. The advertisement features an actor wearing 1990s-era clothing, and holding a Motorola cellular phone. Viewers of the advertisement could also call a special toll free number, 1-833-PAST-PORT (1-833-727-8767), where they would be greeted by a voice message from Fred Savage, and could then leave a voicemail on Honda's microcassette answering machine explaining why they would like to own a 2019 Past-Port. The advertisement is no longer viewable on Honda's YouTube channel as of May 2019, and the toll free number is no longer in service.

Facelift 
The Passport was facelifted for the 2022 model year which gave it a new front end as well as the addition of a new TrailSport trim level that offers a more aggressive off-road-oriented appearance package. The TrailSport model receives model specific bumpers, cosmetic skid plate inserts, all-weather Trailsport logoed floormats, as well as tires with a more aggressive shoulder tread.

Sales

References

Passport
Mid-size sport utility vehicles
All-wheel-drive vehicles
Rear-wheel-drive vehicles
Crossover sport utility vehicles
Off-road vehicles
Motor vehicles manufactured in the United States
Cars introduced in 1993
2000s cars
2010s cars